SoldierStrong (formerly SoldierSocks) is a Stamford, Connecticut based 501(c)(3) charitable organization whose mission is to improve the lives of the men and the women of the United States Armed Forces.

The mission has taken several key forms since SoldierStrong was founded in 2009.  SoldierStrong has provided basic supplies to frontline troops, shipped holiday items to troops and veterans, and now provides revolutionary medical rehabilitation devices to injured and paralyzed veterans, along with virtual reality systems to treat post-traumatic stress and scholarships for veterans seeking to finish their education with a focus on continuing their public service in non-military careers.

Since SoldierStrong's inception, the organization has donated more than $3.5 million of medical devices to help injured veterans.

History
SoldierStrong got its start in Stamford, Connecticut in 2009.  The organization was co-founded by philanthropist and businessman Chris Meek in response to a July 2009 letter from Sergeant Major Luke Converse. Converse requested help in obtaining socks and baby wipes for his Marines serving in Afghanistan who were having difficulty getting these types of supplies at forward operating locations.

Shortly after receipt of this letter, Meek formed a 501(c)(3) to help raise funds and gather basic supplies for the troops. In its first six weeks, SoldierStrong shipped over 1,500 pounds of supplies to Sgt Major Converse and his US Marine Corps unit fighting in Afghanistan.

By May 2018, SoldierStrong had shipped over 37 tons of personal hygienic supplies to US Armed Forces serving in Iraq and Afghanistan, supplying over 75,000 pounds (or 37 tons) of supplies to 73 units fighting overseas.

SoldierStrong broadened its reach in the fall of 2010 to include a new initiative with a similar objective. The group created SoldierSanta in an effort to send gifts to the troops for them to open during the holiday season.

As the wars in Iraq and Afghanistan wound down, SoldierStrong expanded its mission to aid returning military servicemen and women with rehabilitation and prosthetic technologies through its program SoldierSuit, educational opportunities through SoldierScholar, financial aid for veterans receiving spinal care at independent physical rehab facilities through its SoldierRecovery program and providing virtual reality equipment to Veterans Affairs medical centers across the country to help veterans with post-traumatic stress through StrongMind.

Partnerships
Since its inception, SoldierStrong has partnered with a host of local organizations in its drive to supply troops with basic necessities.  In addition to local businesses and organizations, elected officials and community leaders have also assisted in this initiative.
 
Connecticut's Hope Street Pharmacy was the first local organization who offered to partner with SoldierStrong. After Hope Street Pharmacy, SoldierStrong attracted numerous other partners from the local community including The New Balance store in New Canaan, CT, Reveal Hair Salon in Stamford, CT, the Stamford Public Elementary Schools, the Stamford Fire and Police Departments, and Vineyard Vines to name a few. SoldierStrong works with the Marine Aviation Logistics Squadron 49 and Air National Guard out of Stewart Air National Guard Base in Newburgh, New York.
 

In November 2009, Elvis Duran and the Morning Show teamed up with SoldierStrong and pushed the organization onto the national scene via their network of syndicated radio stations in over 30 markets across the country. WWE and Elvis Duran and the Morning Show helped to collect more than 12,000 pairs of socks and 2,500 pounds of supplies.
The Connecticut General Assembly partnered with SoldierSocks in December 2009 for a drive at the Connecticut State Capitol building in Hartford, Connecticut.  They were able to collect more than 500 pounds of tube socks.  Former Lieutenant Governor Michael Fedele along with US Senators Joe Lieberman and Scott Brown have lauded the program along with several other elected and business leaders.  Corporate sponsors have included Sports Illustrated Magazine and Cablevision.  
 
In July 2012, SoldierStrong expanded its efforts launching the new SoldierStrong Veterans Education Foundation to help those returning from the frontlines of battle.

United Rentals became a major corporate sponsor in 2014, and has remained so through at least 2017.  Additionally, they were instrumental in starting the Turns for Troops program.

American Airlines has provided corporate support in the form of free airfare for certain SoldierStrong donation events.

In 2016, Dinosaur Bar-B-Que sponsored the "Sauce for a Cause" promotion to benefit SoldierStrong.  Dinosaur Bar-B-Que provided all proceeds of their co-branded SoldierStrong/Sensuous Slathering BBQ Sauce to SoldierStrong during the Memorial Day season in 2016.

In March 2020, SoldierStrong announced a partnership with Honor and Respect, an Iowa-based firm which raises funds to aid first responders and military personnel who are caught in the midst of the mental health crisis through the sale of one-of-a-kind athletic shoes. SoldierStrong will receive $10 of every purchase of Honor and Respect's shoes.

SoldierStrong partners with the Veterans Administration to offer their StrongMind program, a virtual reality therapy system which is intended to treat post-traumatic stress in veterans receiving services from VA hospitals.

Other partnerships include Specialty Freight Services, Fraternal Order of Eagles, S&P Global, The Wawa Foundation, Multistack, Total, Operation Hat Trick, Horizon Media, General Dynamics, Honeywell, GE Foundation and Rosati Ice.

During an appearance at the 2020 VHA Innovation Experience (iEX) conference on Oct. 27, 2020, SoldierStrong co-founder and chairman Chris Meek announced that the organization was teaming up with Dean Kamen and his company, DEKA (company), to donate ten IBOT wheelchairs to individual wounded veterans. The iBOT wheelchair, developed by Kamen in partnership with DEKA and Johnson & Johnson Independent Technology division, is a one-of-a-kind, powered wheelchair that climbs stairs, allows users to rise from sitting level to six feet tall, maintains superior balance compared to other products on the market and is capable of traveling through sand and standing water.

StrongMind

The StrongMind program provides help for veterans experiencing post-traumatic stress. The virtual reality therapy and accompanying technology offered through Veterans Affairs maximizes the efficiency of post-traumatic stress treatment and appeal to young veterans. StrongMind has made an initial commitment to donate virtual reality hardware and software to 10 VA medical centers across the country.

SoldierStrong, working closely in conjunction with the VA Innovation Center, has recognized VA clinics across the country with an emphasis on research at which to distribute the StrongMind virtual reality post-traumatic stress protocol. As more resources become available and more clinical testing is completed, SoldierStrong plans to expand distribution of the protocol to additional VA centers.

StrongMind relies on a collective expertise from the University of Southern California, Syracuse University, and Iowa State University to provide post-traumatic stress treatment options. The Center for BrainHealth at The University of Texas at Dallas, a research institute dedicated to sustaining brain health, also joined in the StrongMind alliance in September 2019 at the invitation of SoldierStrong.

Through a partnership with Syracuse University, the first StrongMind virtual reality system was donated to the Syracuse VA in September 2019. Additionally, the Puget Sound VA in Tacoma, Washington, the Hunter Holmes McGuire VA in Richmond, Virginia, the North Texas VA in Dallas, Texas, the Michael E. DeBakey VA in Houston, Texas, the Audie L. Murphy VA in San Antonio, Texas, the Gulf Coast Veterans Health Care System in Biloxi, Mississippi, the Charles George VA in Asheville, North Carolina, the Martinsburg VA in Martinsburg, West Virginia, the G.V. (Sonny) Montgomery VA in Jackson, Mississippi and the VA Sierra Nevada in Reno, Nevada all received the StrongMind virtual reality system in 2019. The VA Palo Alto Health Care System in Palo Alto, Texas was the first VA to receive the StrongMind Virtual Reality System in 2020. There have been 13 StrongMind Virtual Reality Systems donated to VA Hospitals since September 2019.

In January 2020, Dr. Albert "Skip" Rizzo from the Institute for Creative Technologies at the University of Southern California and the creator of the BraveMind system in which the StrongMind program utilizes, lead two virtual reality training sessions for VA clinicians at the Charles George VA in Asheville, North Carolina and the North Texas VA in Dallas, Texas. As of January 2020, there have been requests from eight additional VAs for the system and up to forty requests from private interests. In January 2020, a House Veterans Committee panel reviewed and recognized programs from across the country, including SoldierStrong's StrongMind program, that are helping to lower suicide rates among veterans.

SoldierScholar program
In June 2012, SoldierStrong launched a scholarship initiative partnering with the Maxwell School at Syracuse University and the Walsh School of Foreign Service at Georgetown University.

In the Fall Term of 2017, SoldierStrong launched a scholarship for female veterans in STEM (Science, Technology, Engineering, Math) disciplines at Old Dominion University in Virginia.

SoldierStrong also maintains a general scholarship fund available to veterans who wish to finish their college education in order to continue public service careers after their military service concludes.

In November 2019, SoldierStrong announced their annual SoldierScholar recipients. Four veteran students were awarded scholarships, including one Old Dominion University recipient, one Syracuse University recipient and two Georgetown University recipients.

In December 2020, SoldierStrong once again announced their annual SoldierScholar recipients. Three student veterans were awarded scholarships, including a public administration student from Syracuse University, a foreign service student from Georgetown University and a civil engineer technology student from Old Dominion University, all planning to use their degrees to hold roles in capacities that provide services to the United States military and government.

SoldierSuit

In July 2013, SoldierStrong again set its focus on returning veterans and further expanded the scope of its mission. Partnering with Ekso Bionics, efforts are aimed at raising money to aid paralyzed returning veterans in walking again. In October 2013, SoldierStrong launched a fundraising campaign to raise funds to provide these mechanized suits to veterans.  In December 2013, SoldierStrong donated its first suit to a veteran who became paralyzed when his truck drove over an IED in Afghanistan. Their initial goal was to deliver 10 of these suits to wounded and paralyzed veterans.

In the spring of 2013, the Milwaukee VA Medical Center (Wisconsin) hosted Ekso Bionics to demo the mechanized suit. In December 2013, SoldierStrong donated the suit to a wounded veteran seeking treatment at the Milwaukee VA. SoldierStrong delivered its next suit to the VA Boston Healthcare System in April 2014, followed by 2014 donations to VA Medical Centers in Palo Alto (June 2014), Richmond (July 2014), Dallas (October 2014), New Orleans, and New York City (Bronx) (December 2014). In December 2014, SoldierStrong expanded the scope of the SoldierSuit to include prosthetic arms when they announced a partnership with Myomo, a supplier of myoelectric orthotics, with the established goal of providing myoelectric arms braces for veterans. Myomo devices have been donated to veterans in Burlington, MA; Lake Forest, CA; Middlefield, OH, Port Angeles, WA; Sandown, NH, and Lansing, MI.

In 2015, suits were donated to VA Medical Centers in Oklahoma City (April 2015), Seattle (June 2015), and Houston (October 2015). In May 2015, SoldierStrong again expanded the scope of the SoldierSuit to include BiONX ankle. BiONX devices have been donated to VA Medical Centers in San Antonio, Texas and Milwaukee, WI. In 2016, suits were donated to VA Medical Centers in Denver (January 2016), Philadelphia's Magee Rehab Center (March 2016), and Minneapolis, Minnesota (May 2016). In July 2016, SoldierStrong added the Mobius Bionics' LukeARM to the SoldierSuit, and announced an agreement to provide the first ten arm fittings to qualifying veterans.

In 2017, suits were donated to VA Medical Centers in Long Beach (May 2017), Omaha's CHI-Immanuel Rehab (August 2017), and San Antonio (October 2017). In 2018, exoskeletons were donated to the VA Medical Centers in St. Louis (January 2018), Tampa (August 2018) and South Texas (December 2018), as well as the Iowa Methodist Medical Center (July 2018).

In 2019, SoldierStrong more than doubled their initial commitment of ten high-tech medical devices to benefit veterans rounding out their exoskeleton donations to 22, 18 of which have gone to the VA system. In 2019, exoskeletons were donated to the VA Medical Centers in North Texas (January 2019), Phoenix (May 2019), San Diego (July 2019), Cleveland (September 2019) and Boston (December 2019).

Recognition

On April 2, 2014, SoldierStrong Chairman Chris Meek was presented with the Orange Circle Award for the groups' philanthropic work.  Presented by Syracuse University, the award recognizes members of the SU community who have done extraordinary things in the service of others.

SoldierStrong received the President's Call to Service Award from President Barack Obama

On December 8, 2014, SoldierStrong held their inaugural Awards Ceremony at the Union League Club of New York, where it awarded its 2014 Commitment to Service Award to FOX News anchor Martha MacCallum and the 2014 Corporate Leadership Award to Stamford, CT-based United Rentals, Inc.

SU Magazine profiled SoldierStrong in its April 30, 2016 issue.

People Magazine profiled SoldierStrong's work in its February 9, 2017 issue.

The magazine Men's Health featured the work of SoldierStrong in its February 14, 2017 issue.

History.com did a video feature on SoldierStrong's work in March 2017.

In 2018, the George W. Bush Institute announced SoldierStrong Founder and Chairman Chris Meek had been selected to join the Inaugural Class of the Stand-To Veteran Leadership Initiative.

On May 22, 2018, SoldierStrong Chairman Chris Meek testified in front of the U.S. House of Representatives subcommittee on Research and Technology and subcommittee on Energy about using hyper-advanced medical devices to improve the lives of veterans.  Meek was joined in testifying by SoldierStrong Advisory Board Member Martha MacCallum.

On August 26, 2020, veterans representing SoldierStrong were present at Fort McHenry on the third night of the Republican National Convention where they were greeted by President Donald Trump and First Lady Melania Trump and demonstrated the Indego exoskeleton suit by standing for the flag during the national anthem. Vice President Mike Pence also acknowledged SoldierStrong for their work providing revolutionary medical technologies to veterans during his speech to accept the Republican Party's nomination for Vice President.

In 2020, SoldierStrong and the Institute for Creative Technologies at the University of Southern California were nominated by the VHA Innovation Ecosystem, an organization which promotes health care innovation for veterans, to the Igniting Innovation Conference and Awards, which recognizes innovators and innovations that advance the lives of Americans and the government operations which service them. After submitting a video for the award featuring the technology in the StrongMind program, StrongMind was named as a top eight finalist selected by conference attendees on September 2, 2020 and received the "Game Changer" award, which recognizes innovations that provide breakthrough solutions to longstanding problems.

SoldierStrong was featured in The Chronicle of Philanthropy on April 6, 2021, which recognized the work being carried out by the organization.

Professional sports events 

SoldierStrong has been featured in a number of professional sporting events.

In 2014, WWE featured Sgt. Dan Rose walking in the ring in an Ekso device donated to him by SoldierStrong.

In 2015, SoldierStrong was featured during MLB's "Welcome Back Veterans" events at a New York Yankees-Boston Red Sox game and at a Chicago Cubs-Milwaukee Brewers game.

In November 2015, SoldierStrong was featured as part of the NFL's "Salute to Service", and appeared at Eagles, Dolphins, and Vikings, 49ers, and Cowboys stadiums.

In 2016, SoldierStrong became the charitable partner of Turns for Troops.  Turns for Troops is sponsored by United Rentals and the Rahal-Letterman-Lanigan Indycar team. A donation is made for every lap Indy Driver Graham Rahal completes.  Team Rahal-Letterman-Lanigan hosted SoldierStrong and SGT Dan Rose at several races, including pre-race appearances on-track in the Ekso suit.  The program was renewed and expanded for 2017 and 2018. $150,000 was donated in 2017. For every lap Graham Rahal completed in the 2018 Verizon Indy Car Series, sponsor United Rentals donated $50 to SoldierStrong, resulting in a $250,000 donation. Graham Rahel has raised nearly $500,000 for SoldierStrong since 2016.

SoldierStrong has also been a charitable partner of the Never Forget Tribute Classic presented by United Rentals, most recently at the fourth annual Classic in 2019. The Classic features a doubleheader between four notable universities.

Annual gala and awards events 

SoldierStrong began hosting an annual gala event in 2014.  Each year awards are presented to individuals and organizations who SoldierStrong believes have made outstanding contributions to American Service Members and Veterans in the preceding year.

In 2014, the individual award went to Martha MacCallum, and the corporate award went to United Rentals, Inc.

In 2015, the co-recipients of the individual award were Alex Gorsky and Elvis Duran.  The corporate award went to WWE, Inc.

In 2016 Graham Rahal was the individual award winner, and Dinosaur Bar-B-Que was the corporate award winner.

In 2017, former member of the U.S. House of Representatives Jon Runyon was the individual awardee, and Multistack, LLC was the corporate awardee.

In 2018, Bill Koenigsburg, CEO and Founder of Horizon Media, was the individual awardee and S&P Global was the corporate award winner. The Vince & Linda McMahon Family Foundation was also honored.

In 2019, Rich Trotter, CEO of Rosati Ice, was the awardee of SoldierStrong's Commitment to Service Award.

In 2020, Dr. Barbara Van Dahlen, appointed by President Donald Trump as executive director of the President's Roadmap to Empower Veterans to End a National Tragedy of Suicide (PREVENTS) task force, and Dr. Albert "Skip" Rizzo, director of medical virtual reality at the University of Southern California's Institute for Creative Technologies, were recognized as co-recipients of the Commitment to Service Award.

References

External links
 

Organizations based in Stamford, Connecticut
Non-profit organizations based in Connecticut
United States military support organizations
Organizations established in 2009
2009 establishments in Connecticut
Companies based in Stamford, Connecticut